Dermot Bolger (born 1959) is an Irish novelist, playwright, poet and editor from Dublin, Ireland. Born in the Finglas suburb of Dublin in 1959,  his older sister is the writer June Considine. Bolger's novels include Night Shift (1982), The Woman's Daughter (1987), The Journey Home (1990), Father's Music (1997), Temptation (2000), The Valparaiso Voyage (2001) and The Family on Paradise Pier (2005). He is a member of the artist's association Aosdána.

Career

Bolger's early work – especially his first three novels, all set in the working class Dublin suburb of Finglas, and his trilogy of plays that chart forty years of life in the nearby high-rise Ballymun tower blocks that have since been demolished – was often concerned with the articulation of the experiences of working-class characters who, for various reasons, feel alienated from society. 
Later novels are more expansive in their themes and locations. Two novels, The Family on Paradise Pier and An Ark of Light, chronicle the fate of a real Anglo-Irish family, The Goold-Verschoyles, some of whom embrace communism in the 1930s with tragic consequences. While the first novel chronicles the fate of the family until 1948, the second novel, focuses on the daughter, defies convention in 1950s Ireland by leaving a failed marriage to embark on an extraordinary journey of self-discovery from teeming Moroccan streets to living in old age in a caravan that becomes an ark for all those whom she befriends amid the fields of Mayo. An indefatigable idealist, Eva strives to forge her identity while entangled in the fault-lines of her children's unravelling lives. An Ark of Light explores a mother's anxiety for her gay son in a world where homosexuality was still illegal
Bolger's novel, The Lonely Sea and Sky, uses the real-life story of a wartime sea rescue, by the unarmed crew of a tiny Wexford ship, The M.V. Kerlogue, of German sailors from the navy who had previously tried to sink them. 
His novel, Tanglewood, which explored the collapse of the Celtic Tiger, was described by Colum McCann in the Irish Independent as "a superb novel about the implosion not only of the economy in the mid-2000s, but the implosion of marriage and morality and memory too". 
Bolger adapted James Joyce's novel, Ulysses, for the stage. It was first staged by the Tron Theatre in Glasgow in 2012, who toured it to China in 2014. In 2017 it was staged by the Abbey Theatre in Dublin, who revived their production for a second run in 2018.

As an eighteen-year-old factory worker in 1977 Bolger set up Raven Arts Press, which published early books by writers like Patrick McCabe, Colm Toibin, Sara Berkeley, Fintan O’Toole, Eoin McNamee, Kathryn Holmquist, Michael O'Loughlin, Sebastian Barry and Rosita Boland as well as the first English language translations of Nuala Ni Dhomhnaill, and, in 1988, Paddy Doyle's groundbreaking memoir, The God Squad(1988), which is described in The Cambridge History of Irish Literature (page 468) as "an exposé of the institutional regime to which outcast children were subjected by religious care-givers". Raven followed this up with another exposé, this time about Irish Industrial Schools in Patrick Galvin's memoir Song for a Raggy Boy(1991), which was later made into a 2003 film of the same name, directed by Aisling Walsh, which, according to The Cambridge History of Irish Literature (page 553) "focuses on how a lay teacher responds to the verbal and physical abuse doled out by the Christian Brothers in a reformatory school".Bolger ran Raven Arts Press until 1992, when he co-founded New Island Books with Edwin Higel to continue to support new Irish writers. In 2022 New Island Books celebrated thirty years in existence. It describes itself on its website as "Ireland’s premier independent publisher of literary fiction and Irish-interest non-fiction".

Since 1989 Bolger has acted as associate editor of the "New Irish Writing" page, which has been edited by Ciaran Carty in a succession of Irish newspapers since 1989, continuing a tradition started by David Marcus in 1969 in the now defunct Irish Press newspaper. The page is currently hosted by the Irish Independent newspaper. 

In May 2022 Bolger received an honorary doctorate in literature from the National University of Ireland, in a ceremony at the Royal College of Physicians in Dublin, during which a similar honorary doctorate was conferred on Marie Heaney.

Writings
Night Shift (1985) is Bolger's first novel. The main protagonist is Donal, a young man from Finglas who works the night shift in a local factory. Donal's girlfriend, Elizabeth, is pregnant and they both live in a caravan at the foot of her parents' garden. Needless to say, her parents are hardly thrilled at the situation and Donal works hard to improve the life he shares with Elizabeth.

The Journey Home (1990) was originally published by Penguin and was a controversial Irish bestseller. It was later re-issued by Flamingo/HarperCollins. 18 years after its publication, it was published in the United States by the University of Texas Press and received the lead front cover review on the New York Times Book Review section. The Irish Times said of it: "All 1990s life is there – drink, drugs, political corruption – all the words which have been repeated so often now that they have lost their power to shock. Here, they shock".

The Family on Paradise Pier (2005) starts in a tranquil County Donegal village in 1915 and follows the journeys of one Irish family through the Irish War of Independence, the General Strike in Britain, 1930s Moscow, the Spanish Civil War, and on to Soviet gulags, Irish internment camps, and Blitz-era London. The Goold-Verschoyle children are born into a respected freethinking Protestant family in a Manor House alive with laughter, debate and fascinating guests. The world of picnics and childish infatuations is soon under threat as political changes within Ireland and the wider world encroach. This family saga is based on Based on real-life people, with the character of Brendan based on Brian Goold-Verschoyle who died in a Soviet gulag and Art is based on real-life Irish communist Neil Goold-Verschoyle. She is based on Sheila Fitzgerald (née Goold-Verschoyle; 1903–2000). The novel's origins are in tape recordings that the author made in her caravan in 1992.

Other novels
 1987 and 1991: The Woman’s Daughter
 1992: Emily’s Shoes
 1994: A Second Life
 1997: Father's Music
 2000: Temptation
 2007: The Valparaiso Voyage
 2005: The Family on Paradise Pier (a story about Brian Goold-Verschoyle)
 2010: New Town Soul
 2012: The Fall of Ireland
 2015: Tanglewood
 2016: The Lonely Sea and Sky (a coming of age novel about the wartime rescue by the Irish ship, The MV Kerlogue)
 2018: An Ark of Light (this standalone novel tells the story of the later half of the life of Eva Fitzgerald – née Goold-Verschoyle – the central figure in Bolger's 2005 novel, The Family on Paradise Pier.
 2020: Secrets Never Told. Bolger's first and only collection of short stories, one of them close to novella length. His publishers called them stories that "delve under the veneer of our lives, delve into the secrets that bind relationships together or tears them apart, and create worlds where people discover how nothing about their past is truly certain". In far shorter original versions, many were initially broadcast on BBC Radio 4.

Plays
 1989: The Lament for Arthur Cleary
 1990: Blinded by the Light
 1990: In High Germany
 1990: The Holy Ground
 1991: One Last White Horse
 1994: A Dublin Bloom
 1995: April Bright
 1999: The Passion of Jerome
 2000: Consenting Adults
 2004: A Dublin Bloom (full production – Chicago)
 2005: From these Green Heights
 2006: The Townlands of Brazil
 2007: Walking the Road
 2008: The Consequences of Lightning
 2010: The Parting Glass* (This stand-alone play is a follow-up, 20 years on, about the life of Eoin, the emigrant narrator of Bolger's earlier play, In High Germany.)
2012: Tea Chests and Dreams
2012: Ulysses: a stage adaptation of James Joyce's novel (Produced by the Tron Theatre, Glasgow, which toured Scotland and China)2017:  Ulysses: a revised and expanded stage adaption of Joyce's novel (Premiered at the Abbey Theatre, Dublin, as part of the 2017 Dublin Theatre Festival, Oct 2017)
2017:  Bang Bang2019:  Last Orders at the Dockside Staged by the Abbey Theatre as part of the 2019 Dublin Theatre Festival
2020:  A Hand of Jacks A Monologue commissioned by the Abbey Theatre as part of a national response to the coronavirus, entitled Dear Ireland where they asked fifty playwrights to each write one monologue and nominate an actor who would self-tape their performances from social isolation. Bolger’s play was performed by Dawn Bradfield
2021:  The Messenger A one-woman play about the North Strand bombings in Dublin in 1941, streamed on line by Axis, Ballymun, to mark the 80th anniversary of the bombing, directed by Mark O'Brien.

Poetry
 1980: The Habit of Flesh, Raven Arts Press
 1981: Finglas Lilies, Raven Arts Press
 1982: No Waiting America, Raven Arts Press
 1986: Internal Exiles, Dublin: Dolmen
 1989: Leinster Street Ghosts, Raven Arts Press
 1998: Taking my Letters Back, Dublin: New Island Books
 2004: The Chosen Moment, Dublin: New Island Books
 2008: External Affairs, Dublin: New Island Books, 80 pages. 
 2012: The Venice Suite: A Voyage Through Loss, Dublin: New Island Books.
 2015: That Which is Suddenly Precious: New & Selected Poems, Dublin: New Island Books.
 2022: Other People's Lives, Dublin: New Island Books.

Research work
 Alain Mouchel-Vallon, "La réécriture de l'histoire dans les Romans de Roddy Doyle, Dermot Bolger et Patrick McCabe" (PhD thesis, 2005, Reims University, France).
 Damien Shortt, "The State of the Nation: Paradigms of Irishness in the Drama and Fiction of Dermot Bolger" (PhD thesis, 2006, Mary Immaculate College, University of Limerick, Ireland).
 Ryan, Ray. Ireland and Scotland: Literature and Culture, State and Nation, 1966–2000. Oxford University Press, 2002.
 Paschel, Ulrike: No Mean City?: the image of Dublin in the novels of Dermot Bolger, Roddy Doyle and Val Mulkerns. Frankfurt am Main [u.a.]: Lang, 1998. – X, 170 S. (Aachen British and American studies; 1). 
 Merriman, Vic: "Staging contemporary Ireland: heartsickness and hopes deferred". In: Shaun Richards (ed.), The Cambridge Companion to Contemporary Irish Drama. Cambridge: Cambridge University Press, 2004; pp. 244–257 (On The Lament for Arthur Cleary, 1989).
 Murphy, Paul: "Inside the immigrant mind : nostalgic versus nomadic subjectivities in late twentieth-century Irish drama". In: Australasian Drama Studies, 43 (October 2003), pp. 128–147 (On A Dublin Quartet).
 Tew, Philip: "The lexicon of youth in Mac Laverty, Bolger, and Doyle: Theorizing contemporary Irish fiction via Lefebvre's Tenth Prelude". In: Hungarian Journal of English and American Studies, 5:1 (1999), pp. 181–197.
Harte, Liam: "A kind of scab: Irish identity in the writings of Dermot Bolger and Joseph O'Connor". In: Irish Studies Review, 20 (1997 autumn), pp. 17–22.
 MacCarthy, Conor: "Ideology and geography in Dermot Bolger's The Journey Home". In: Irish University Review, 27:1 (1997 Spring-Summer), pp. 98–110.
 Merriman, Vic: "Centring the wanderer: Europe as active imaginary in contemporary Irish theatre". In: Irish University Review: a journal of Irish studies, 27:1 (1997 Spring-Summer), pp. 166–181 (On The Lament for Arthur Cleary).
 Aragay, Mireia: "Reading Dermot Bolger's The Holy Ground: national identity, gender and sexuality in post-colonial Ireland". In: Links and Letters, 4 (1997), pp. 53–64.
 Turner, Tramble T.: "Staging signs of gender". In: John Deely (ed.), Semiotics 1994: Annual proceedings volumes of the Semiotic Society of America. 19. New York: Lang, 1995. pp. 335–344 (On The Lament for Arthur Cleary, 1989).
 Dantanus, Ulf.: "Antæus in Dublin?" In: Moderna språk (97:1), 2003, pp. 37–52.
 Battaglia, Alberto.: Dublino: oltre Joyce. Milan: Unicopli, 2002. pp. 130 (Città letterarie).
Dumay, Émile-Jean.:  "Dermot Bolger dramaturge". In: Études irlandaises (27:1) 2002, pp. 79–92.
Dumay, Émile-Jean.:  "La subversion de la nostalgie dans The Lament for Arthur Cleary de Dermot Bolger". In: Études irlandaises (21:2) 1996, pp. 111–23.
 Fiérobe, Claude: "Irlande et Europe 1990: The Journey Home de Dermot Bolger". In: Études irlandaises (19:2) 1994, pp. 41–49.
 Kearney, Colbert: "Dermot Bolger and the dual carriageway". In: Études irlandaises (19:2), 1994, pp. 25–39.
 Shortt, Damien: "A River Runs Through It: Irish History in Contemporary Fiction, Dermot Bolger and Roddy Doyle". In: Paddy Lyons; Alison O'Malley-Younger (eds), No Country for Old Men: Fresh Perspectives on Irish Literature. Frankfurt am Main [u.a.] Oxford u.a.: Lang, 2009. pp. 123–141 (Reimagining Ireland; 4).
 Murphy, Paula: "From Ballymun to Brazil: Bolger's Postmodern Ireland". In: Eamon Maher ... (eds), Modernity and Postmodernity in a Franco-Irish Context. Frankfurt am Main [u.a.]: Lang, 2008. pp. 161–178 (Studies in Franco-Irish Relations; 2).
Shortt, Damien: "Dermot Bolger: Gender Performance and Society". In: Paula Murphy... (eds), New Voices in Irish literary Criticism. Lewiston, N.Y.; Lampeter: Edwin Mellen, 2007. pp. 151–166.
Brihault, Jean: "Dermot Bolger, romancier de la mondialisation?" In: Yann Bévant ... (eds), Issues of Globalisation and Secularisation in France and Ireland. Frankfurt, M. [u.a.]: Lang, 2009. pp. 101–122 (Studies in Franco-Irish Relations; 3).
Wald, Christina: "Dermot Bolger". In: Martin Middeke (ed.), The Methuen Drama Guide to Contemporary Irish Playwrights, London: Methuen Drama, 2010. pp. 19–36.
Shortt, Damien: "Who put the ball in the English net: the privatisation of Irish postnationalism in Dermot Bolger's in High Germany". In: Irene Gilsenan Nordin; Carmen Zamorano Llena (eds), Redefinitions of Irish identity: a postnationalist approach. Frankfurt, M. [u.a.]: Lang, 2010. pp. 103–124 (Cultural identity studies; 12).
Imhof, Rüdiger: "Dermot Bolger". In: The Modern Irish Novel: Irish Novelists after 1945. Rüdiger Imhof.  Dublin : Wolfhound Press, 2002. pp. 267–285.
Murphy, Paula: "Scattering us like seed: Dermot Bolger's postnationalist Ireland". In: Irene Gilsenan Nordin; Carmen Zamorano Llena (eds), Redefinitions of Irish Identity: a postnationalist approach. Frankfurt, M. [u.a.]: Lang, 2010. pp. 181–199 (Cultural identity studies; 12).
Schreiber, Mark: "Playing it out – football and Irishness in contemporary Irish drama". In: Sandra Mayer; Julia Novak; Margarete Rubik (eds), Ireland in Drama, Film, and Popular Culture : Festschrift for Werner Huber. Trier: WVT Wissenschaftlicher Verl. Trier, 2012. pp. 83–89.
 Murphy, Paula: " 'Marooned men in foreign cities': encounters with the Other in Dermot Bolger's The Ballymun Trilogy". In: Pilar Villar-Argáiz (ed), Literary visions of multicultural Ireland: The immigrant in contemporary Irish literature. Manchester: Manchester University Press, 2014. pp. 151–162.
 Salis, Loredana: "Goodnight and joy be with you all: tales of contemporary Dublin city life". In: Pilar Villar-Argáiz (ed), Literary visions of multicultural Ireland: The immigrant in contemporary Irish literature. Manchester: Manchester University Press, 2014. pp. 243–254.
 Schrage-Früh, Michaela: "Like a foreigner / in my native land: transculturality and Otherness in twenty-first-century Irish poetry". In: Pilar Villar-Argáiz (ed), Literary visions of multicultural Ireland: The immigrant in contemporary Irish literature. Manchester: Manchester University Press, 2014. pp. 163–175.
 Mikowski, Sylvie: "Dermot Bolger et la Raven Arts Press: A loose coalition for change". In: Genet, Jacqueline (ed), Le livre en Irlande: l'imprimé en contexte. Caen: Presses Univ. de Caen, 2006. pp. 137–146.
O'Brien, Cormac: "Unblessed Amongst Women: Performing Patriarchy Without Men in Contemporary Irish Theatre". In: Christopher Collins; Mary P. Caulfield (eds), Ireland, Memory and Performing the Historical Imagination. Basingstoke: Palgrave Macmillan, 2014. pp. 190–195.
Grene, Nicholas: "Snapshots : A year in the life of a theatre judge". In: Donald E. Morse (ed), Irish theatre in transition : from the late nineteenth to the early twenty-first century. Basingstoke: Palgrave Macmillan, 2015. pp. 175–176.
 Müller, Sonja: Von der georgianischen Ära bis zum Zeitalter des keltischen Tigers: der Wandel der Stadtdarstellung im Dublinroman. Berlin: Lit, 2015. – pp. 263–285 (Erlanger Studien zur Anglistik und Amerikanistik; 16). 
 Kilroy, Claire: "Dermot Bolger: Tanglewood". In: Times Literary Supplement (5857) 2015, pp. 26.
 Phillips, Terry: Irish Literature and the First World War: Culture, Identity and Memory. Frankfurt am Main [u.a.] Oxford u.a.: Lang, 2015. pp. 255–260, 261 (Reimagining Ireland; 72).  (On Walking the Road).
 Hanrahan, Anna: Narrating the Ballymun Experience in Dermot Bolger's Ballymun Trilogy''. Trier : Wissenschaftlicher Verlag Trier, 2016. pp. 99–114 (Irish Studies in Europe; 7). .

References

External links
 Author's official website

Living people
1959 births
Irish novelists
Irish poets
People from Finglas
Aosdána members
20th-century Irish writers
20th-century male writers
21st-century Irish writers
21st-century Irish male writers
Irish male novelists
Irish male poets